Stephen Brookes (born 12 September 1956) is a former English cricketer.  Brookes was a left-handed batsman who bowled left-arm medium pace.  He was born at Netherton, Worcestershire.

Having played for the Worcestershire Second XI from 1976 to 1978, Brookes made his first team debut in county cricket for Staffordshire against Cheshire in the 1979 Minor Counties Championship.  He played Minor counties cricket for Staffordshire from 1979 to 1981, making thirteen appearances for the county in the Minor Counties Championship during that period, with his final appearance coming against Northumberland.  Brookes later played first-class cricket in South Africa for Eastern Province B, making three appearances in the 1981/82 SAB Bowl, playing twice against Boland and once Transvaal B.  The following season, he made just a single appearance against Boland in the 1982/83 SAB Bowl.  In his four first-class appearances for Eastern Province B, he took 7 wickets at an average of 29.57, with best figures of 2.26.

References

External links
Stephen Brookes at ESPNcricinfo
Stephen Brookes at CricketArchive

1956 births
Living people
People from the Metropolitan Borough of Dudley
English cricketers
Staffordshire cricketers
Eastern Province cricketers